The Yale High School Gymnasium is a historic building located in Yale, Iowa, United States. Completed in 1932, it was the first round gymnasium built in the state of Iowa. It was designed by Halver R. Straight, a mechanical engineer whose primary work was in the ceramics industry with the construction of silos, and this building is similarly constructed with clay tiles. The gymnasium served the local high school basketball teams until 1961 when it was consolidated with the schools in Jamaica and Bagley. From then until 1989 it was used for the elementary school's physical education classes. It was then open for use by the local community. Through the years the building also hosted band concerts, commencements, plays, banquets, and a game by the Harlem Globetrotters. The circumference of the structure measures . The interior building features a small court that measures , a stage, and bleachers. Its design was impractical as the court was adjacent with the block walls. The building was listed on the National Register of Historic Places in 2018.

References

School buildings completed in 1932
Buildings and structures in Guthrie County, Iowa
National Register of Historic Places in Guthrie County, Iowa
School buildings on the National Register of Historic Places in Iowa
1932 establishments in Iowa